The Łódź—Koluszki railway is a national importance railway line in Poland., connecting Łódź Fabryczna station with Koluszki station. Due to its character it is the main route for passenger trains passing through the city of Łódź. It is a crucial part of Łódź Cross-City Line.

One section between Łódź Fabryczna and Gałkówek stations is exclusively used by passenger trains.

History 
The history of the railway begins in the 19th century. The textile industry in Łódź started to bloom, yet the city had no convenient transportation routes for exporting the goods to other parts of Russian Empire. It was clear - for further development Łódź needs the railway link.

In 1865, The Łódź Factory Railway Company (pol. Towarzystwo Drogi Żelaznej Fabryczno-Łódzkiej) - a joint venture company of Karl Wilhelm Scheibler and Jan Bloch - was formed, and in the same year, on 30. June. Russian authorities gave the company permission to build a single  track railway from Łódź to Koluszki, which were situated on the Warsaw—Vienna railway.

The construction began on 1. September and was finished on 18. November 1865. On 19. November the railway was ceremonially opened, and the freight service began to operate. One year later, due to opening of Łódź Fabryczna station, a regular passenger service started operating.

From 1898 to 1901 the railway received a second track - this time built with  gauge, due to connection with newly built circular railway, going around the southern border of the city to connect with Łódź Kaliska station, located on the west side of the city. Track gauges were unified by Germans during World War I. In 1954 the railway was electrified, while a decade later a connector line, allowing trains from Łódź to head toward Piotrków Trybunalski without turning around in Koluszki, was built.

From 2011 to 2012 the section between Łódź Fabryczna and Łódź Widzew stations was rebuilt, as the construction of cross-city tunnel commenced. The section was reopened in December 2016.

Future 
The railway is scheduled to receive an extension to the west within the cross-city tunnel, which will allow trains to travel through Łódź Fabryczna station toward Łódź Kaliska and Żabieniec stations

References 

Railway lines in Poland
Transport in Łódź